Ina Beyermann (born 11 April 1965 in Leverkusen) is a German former swimmer who competed in the 1984 Summer Olympics and in the 1988 Summer Olympics.

References

1965 births
Living people
German female swimmers
German female freestyle swimmers
German female butterfly swimmers
Olympic swimmers of West Germany
Swimmers at the 1984 Summer Olympics
Swimmers at the 1988 Summer Olympics
Olympic silver medalists for West Germany
Olympic bronze medalists for West Germany
Olympic bronze medalists in swimming
Sportspeople from Leverkusen
European Aquatics Championships medalists in swimming
Medalists at the 1984 Summer Olympics
Olympic silver medalists in swimming
20th-century German women
21st-century German women